Bairathal Kallan is a village panchayat located in the Nagaur district of Rajasthan state, India. The latitude 27.0647257 and longitude 73.3804481 are the geocoordinate of the Bairathal Kallan. It is located around 240.3 kilometer away from Bairathal Kallan.

History 
The Bairathal Kallan village was established about 700–750 years ago.  This village was established by the Nath community; At that time the main saint of the Nath community was Bairaginath, and the village was named after him. There are three villages in Bairathal Kallan Gram Panchayats in India - Bairathal Kallan, Bairathal Khurd, and Jagrampura. Khurd and Kalan Persian language word which means small and Big respectively when two villages have same name then it is distinguished as Kalan means Big and Khurd means Small with Village Name.

Population 
According to Census-2011 information:
With total 656 families residing, Berathal Kalan village has the population of 3523 (of which 1819 are males while 1704 are females).

Notable places

Government offices 
Panchayat Bhawan : Centre of village Government.
Post Office
Patwar Bhawan 
Atal Seva Kendra
Sahkari Bhawan, Gram Seva Sahkari Samiti

Hospital

Educational institutions
Govt. Senior Secondary School, Bairathal Kallan
Ronak Public Senior Secondary School
Modern Public Shikshan Sansthan Sen. Sec. School

External links 

Villages in Nagaur district